Eight ships of the United States Navy and Revenue-Marine have been named USS Massachusetts, after the Commonwealth of Massachusetts.

 , a topsail schooner, was the first Revenue-Marine cutter of the United States, sold in 1792.
 , a sloop built to replace .
 , was a wooden steamer that saw action during the Mexican–American War and in Puget Sound.
 , was an iron screw steamer that saw action during the American Civil War.
 , was the never-launched  monitor Passaconaway renamed first to Thunderer then to Massachusetts before being scrapped in 1884.
  was an  commissioned in 1896 and the second battleship procured by the United States Navy, saw action in the Spanish–American War, scuttled in 1921.
 , was purchased by the U.S. Navy as SS Massachusetts from the Eastern Steamship Co. in 1917; commissioned 7 December 1917 and renamed Shawmut 7 January 1918.
  would have been a battleship of the first South Dakota class, canceled by the Washington Naval Treaty in 1923.
  was a battleship of the second South Dakota class, commissioned in 1942 and which saw action in World War II, now a museum ship in Fall River, Massachusetts.
  is a  laid down in 2020.

United States Navy ship names